Sichuan Jiuniu Football Club (Simplified Chinese: 四川九牛足球俱乐部) is a professional Chinese football club that currently participates in the China League One division under licence from the Chinese Football Association (CFA). The team is based in Chengdu, Sichuan, China and their home stadium is the 27,000 seat Longquanyi Stadium.

History
The club was founded on 5 January 2017. They participated in the 2017 China Amateur Football League the same year and managed to advance to the national play-offs, but was eliminated by Zhaoqing Hengtai in the first round. They were ranked 10th and later admitted into China League Two due to the withdrawal of several other teams.

In February 2019, City Football Group purchased the club.

On 23 May 2020, the Chinese Football Association announced that eleven professional clubs across China's top three divisions would have their registration cancelled over a failure to pay player wages. As a result, the CFA announced a reclassification of the teams which would contest their professional divisions. According to this reclassification, Sichuan Jiuniu was promoted to China League One for the 2020 season, which had already been delayed because of the COVID-19 pandemic.

Name history
2017–  Sichuan Jiuniu F.C.  四川九牛

Players

Current squad

Out on loan

Coaching staff
Source:

Managerial history

 Zhai Biao (2006–2008)
 Sun Bowei (caretaker; 2008)
 Xu Jianye (2009–2010)
 Zhao Lei (2010)
 Sun Bowei (2011–2017)
 Cheng Liang (31 December 2017 – 30 May 2018)
 Dario Dabac (7 June 2018 – 11 January 2019)
 Wang Hongwei (27 February 2019 – 18 May 2020)
 Li Yi (22 July 2020 – 25 December 2021)
 Sergio Lobera (19 January 2022 – present)

Results
All-time League Rankings

As of the end of 2019 season.

Key
<div>

 Pld = Played
 W = Games won
 D = Games drawn
 L = Games lost
 F = Goals for
 A = Goals against
 Pts = Points
 Pos = Final position

 DNQ = Did not qualify
 DNE = Did not enter
 NH = Not Held
 – = Does Not Exist
 R1 = Round 1
 R2 = Round 2
 R3 = Round 3
 R4 = Round 4

 F = Final
 SF = Semi-finals
 QF = Quarter-finals
 R16 = Round of 16
 Group = Group stage
 GS2 = Second Group stage
 QR1 = First Qualifying Round
 QR2 = Second Qualifying Round
 QR3 = Third Qualifying Round

References

External links
http://sports.people.com (in Chinese)

Sichuan Jiuniu F.C.
Football clubs in Chengdu
2017 establishments in China
Association football clubs established in 2017